In the Mouth of Madness is the fourth album released by Luni Coleone. It was released on February 20, 2001 for Sicc-a-Cell Records and was produced by Killa Tay, Luni Coleone, JT the Bigga Figga, Willie Hollis and Trump Tight. In the Mouth of Madness peaked at No. 85 on the Billboard Top R&B/Hip-Hop Albums chart. Guests on the album include Bay Area legends Killa Tay, Daz Dillinger, X-Raided, Guce, B-Legit and Marvaless. The skit "Cigga Weed" features some of Chris Tucker's dialogue from the film Rush Hour.

Track listing
"In the Mouth of Madness (Lady Smoke - Intro)" - 0:39  
"Turf Niggaz" - 3:16  
"My Name" - 4:12  
"24-7 (Hook Jazzy - Solo)" - 4:15  
"Real Shit" - 1:11  
"All I Ever Wanted" - 3:49  
"Been So Long" - 4:07 (Featuring Killa Tay, Marvaless) 
"Ya-Ya" - 3:36  
"Cigga Weed (Skit)" - 0:48  
"Seasoned Veteran" - 4:10 (Featuring Daz Dillinger, Laroo the Hard Hitter) 
"Neva Trust a Hoe" - 4:12  
"Family" - 3:48 (Featuring X-Raided) 
"2 Bonnies & 1 Clyde" - 3:52 (Featuring Marvaless, Lady Smoke)  
"Friends (Intro)" - 1:26  
"Friends" - 3:52 (Featuring Mad Dog)  
"Where Dem Thugz At?" - 3:52 (Featuring B-Legit) 
"In the Mouth of Madness" - 3:55  
"No Mystery" - 4:15 (Featuring Nitty, Guce, King Philly)

2001 albums
Luni Coleone albums